Home Plate Entertainment is an American animation studio, founded in 2010 by Emmy Award-winning producer, Bill Schultz.

History
On September 28, 2010, Bill Schultz established Home Plate Entertainment after years of animation experiences and 12 years of working at MoonScoop Entertainment. The studio has also partnered with Yowza! Animation and several other studios.

Filmography

Current series

Music videos

In production

Cancelled projects
Happy Tree Friends: The Movie (co-produced with Mondo Media, DLE, Telegael, Neon Pumpkin, Big Jump and The Orchard.)

See also
Bill Schultz (producer)

References

External links
Official website
Home Plate Entertainment on Internet Movie Database

American animation studios
Entertainment companies based in California
Mass media companies established in 2010
Companies based in Calabasas, California
2010 establishments in California